The 17th PMPC Star Awards for Television to be held at the UP Theater, Quezon City on October 11, 2003 and to be broadcast on RPN Channel 9 on Saturday Night Playhouse. The awards night will be hosted by Kris Aquino, Boy Abunda, Lorna Tolentino, Bong Revilla, Charlene Gonzales, Paolo Bediones and Sharon Cuneta and to be directed by Al Quinn and Stage Direction by Maribeth Bichara.

It is part of the "50 Years Philippine Television" celebration from February 9, 2003 to December 31, 2003.

Nominees and winners
These are the nominations for the 17th Star Awards for Television. The winners will be in bold and in the top of the list.

Best TV station
ABS-CBN-2
NBN-4
ABC-5
GMA-7
RPN-9
ZOE TV-11
IBC-13

Best Drama Series
Ang Iibigin Ay Ikaw (GMA 7)
Bituin (ABS-CBN 2)
Habang Kapiling Ka (GMA 7)
Kay Tagal Kang Hinintay (ABS-CBN 2)
Kung Mawawala Ka (GMA 7)

Best Drama Actress
Bea Alonzo (Kay Tagal Kang Hinintay / ABS-CBN 2)
Nora Aunor (Bituin / ABS-CBN 2)
Angelika de la Cruz (Habang Kapiling Ka / GMA 7)
Hilda Koronel (Kung Mawawala Ka / GMA 7)
Rica Peralejo (Kay Tagal Kang Hinintay / ABS-CBN 2)
Snooky Serna (Habang Kapiling Ka / GMA 7)
Lorna Tolentino (Kay Tagal Kang Hinintay / ABS-CBN 2)

Best Drama Actor
John Lloyd Cruz (Kay Tagal Kang Hinintay / ABS-CBN 2)
Raymond Bagatsing (Kung Mawawala Ka / GMA 7)
Christopher de Leon (Ang Iibigin Ay Ikaw / GMA 7)
Chubi del Rosario (Ang Iibigin Ay Ikaw / GMA 7)
John Estrada (Kay Tagal Kang Hinintay / ABS-CBN 2)
Eddie Garcia (Kung Mawawala Ka / GMA 7)
Patrick Garcia (Darating Ang Umaga / ABS-CBN 2)

Best Drama Anthology
Maalaala Mo Kaya (ABS-CBN 2)
Magpakailanman (GMA 7)

Best Single Performance by an Actress
Nora Aunor (Maalaala Mo Kaya: Lubid / ABS-CBN 2)
Matet de Leon (Maalaala Mo Kaya: Kubo / ABS-CBN 2)
Sunshine Dizon (Magpakailanman: Kakaibang Mukha ng Pag-ibig / GMA 7)
Jaclyn Jose (Maalaala Mo Kaya: Garapon / ABS-CBN 2)
Jolina Magdangal (Magpakailanman: Pasakalye ng Isang Pangarap / GMA 7)
Cherry Pie Picache (Tanging Yaman, The Series: Sa Kandungan Mo Inay / ABS-CBN 2)
Maricel Soriano (Maalaala Mo Kaya: Sing-Along Bar / ABS-CBN 2)

Best Single Performance by an Actor
Carlo Aquino (Tanging Yaman, The Series: Sa Kandungan Mo Inay / ABS-CBN 2)
Raymond Bagatsing (Magpakailanman: May Liwanag Sa Dilim / GMA 7)
Tirso Cruz III (Magpakailanman: Minsan May Isang Pangako / GMA 7)
Dominic Ochoa (Maalaala Mo Kaya: Paper Dolls / ABS-CBN 2)
Roderick Paulate (Maalaala Mo Kaya: Torotot / ABS-CBN 2)
John Prats (Maalaala Mo Kaya: Garapon / ABS-CBN 2)

Best New Male TV Personality
Marc Acueza (Maalaala Mo Kaya: Life Plan / ABS-CBN 2)
Ketchup Eusebio (Maalaala Mo Kaya: Istatwa / ABS-CBN 2)
Luis Manzano (ASAP Mania / ABS-CBN 2)
Jay R (SOP / GMA 7)
Brad Turvey (Kahit Kailan / GMA 7)

Best New Female TV Personality
Valerie Concepcion (Click / GMA 7)
Amanda Griffin (F / ABS-CBN 2)
Cindy Kurleto (Masayang Tanghali Bayan / ABS-CBN 2)
Karel Marquez (Berks / ABS-CBN 2)
Tuesday Vargas (Klasmeyts / ABS-CBN 2)

Best Gag Show
Bubble Gang (GMA 7)
Ispup (ABC 5)
Klasmeyts (ABS-CBN 2)
Wow Mali (ABC 5)

Best Comedy Show
Bida si Mister, Bida si Misis (ABS-CBN 2)
Daddy Di Do Du (GMA 7)
Idol Ko Si Kap (GMA 7)
Kool Ka Lang (GMA 7)
OK Fine, Whatever (ABS-CBN 2)

Best Comedy Actor
Ogie Alcasid (Bubble Gang / GMA 7)
Joey de Leon (Beh Bote Nga / GMA 7)
Edu Manzano (OK Fine, Whatever / ABS-CBN 2)
Vic Sotto (Daddy Di Do Du / GMA 7)
Michael V. (Bubble Gang / GMA 7)

Best Comedy Actress
Ai-Ai de las Alas (Whattamen / ABS-CBN 2)
Alma Moreno (Daboy en Da Girl / GMA 7)
Rufa Mae Quinto (Bubble Gang / GMA 7)
Maricel Soriano (Bida si Mister, Bida si Misis / ABS-CBN 2)
Nova Villa (Home Along Da Riles/ ABS-CBN 2)

Best Musical Variety Show
ASAP Mania (ABS-CBN 2)
SOP (GMA 7)
Master Showman Presents (GMA 7)

Best Musical Special
A Joli-Na Christmas (GMA 7)
Back 2 Back 2 Christmas (GMA 7)
Dolphy: Diamond Life (ABS-CBN 2)
Isang Pamilya, Isang Puso Ngayong Pasko (ABS-CBN 2)

Best Variety Show
Eat Bulaga (GMA-7)
Masayang Tanghali Bayan (ABS-CBN 2)

Best Female TV Host
Claudine Barretto (ASAP Mania / ABS-CBN 2)
Pops Fernandez (ASAP Mania / ABS-CBN 2)
Jaya (SOP / GMA 7)
Zsa Zsa Padilla (ASAP Mania / ABS-CBN 2)
Regine Velasquez (SOP / GMA 7)

Best Male TV Host
Ogie Alcasid (SOP / GMA 7)
Joey de Leon (Eat Bulaga! / GMA 7)
Randy Santiago (Masayang Tanghali Bayan / ABS-CBN 2)
Vic Sotto (Eat Bulaga! / GMA 7)

Best Public Service Program
Emergency (GMA 7)
Imbestigador (GMA 7)
Mission X (ABS-CBN 2)
True Crime (ABS-CBN 2)
Willingly Yours (ABS-CBN 2)
Wish Ko Lang (GMA 7)

Best Public Service Program Host
Arnold Clavio (Emergency / GMA 7)
Mike Enriquez (Imbestigador / GMA 7)
Willie Revillame (Willingly Yours / ABS-CBN 2)
Bernadette Sembrano (Wish Ko Lang /GMA 7)
Erwin Tulfo (Mission X / ABS-CBN 2)

Best Horror-Fantasy Program
Kakabakaba (GMA 7)
Wansapanataym / (ABS-CBN 2)

Best Game Show
Digital LG Quiz (GMA 7)
Game KNB? (ABS-CBN 2)
K! The P1,000,000 Videoke Challenge (GMA 7)
Sing Galing (TV5)

Best Game Show Host
Kris Aquino (Game KNB? / ABS-CBN 2)
Paolo Bediones and Regine Tolentino (Digital LG Quiz / GMA 7)
Ai-Ai de las Alas and Allan K. (Sing Galing / TV5)
Arnell Ignacio (K! The P1,000,000 Videoke Challenge / GMA 7)

Best Youth Oriented Program
Berks (ABS-CBN 2)
Click (GMA 7)
Kahit Kailan (GMA 7)
Tabing Ilog (ABS-CBN 2)

Best Educational Program
Ating Alamin (IBC 13)
Entrepinoy (IBC 13)
Good Take (IBC 13)
Knowledge Power (ABS-CBN 2)
Kumikitang Kabuhayan (ABS-CBN 2)

Best Educational Program Host
Zorah Andam (Good Take / IBC 13)
Ernie Baron (Knowledge Power / ABS-CBN 2)
Gerry Geronimo (Ating Alamin / IBC 13)
January Isaac (Entrepinoy / IBC 13)
Peter Musñgi (Kumikitang Kabuhayan / ABS-CBN 2)

Best Celebrity Talk Show
Inday Heart to Heart (GMA 7)
Morning Girls with Kris and Korina (ABS-CBN 2)
Partners: Mel and Jay (GMA 7)
Sharon (ABS-CBN 2)
Sis (GMA 7)

Best Celebrity Talk Show Host
Kris Aquino and Korina Sanchez (Morning Girls with Kris and Korina / ABS-CBN 2)
Inday Badiday (Inday Heart to Heart / GMA 7)
Sharon Cuneta (Sharon / ABS-CBN 2)
Janice de Belen and Gelli de Belen (Sis / GMA 7)
Jay Sonza and Mel Tiangco (Partners: Mel and Jay / GMA 7)

Best Magazine Show
The Correspondents (ABS-CBN 2)
E.T.C. (ABS-CBN 2)
Jessica Soho Reports (GMA 7)
Pipol (ABS-CBN 2)
The Probe Team (GMA 7)

Best Magazine Show Host
Paolo Bediones and Miriam Quiambao (Extra Extra / GMA 7)
Karen Davila and Company (The Correspondents / ABS-CBN 2)
Ces Drilon (Pipol / ABS-CBN 2)
Cheche Lazaro (The Probe Team / GMA 7)
Jessica Soho (Jessica Soho Reports / GMA 7)

Best News Program
ABS-CBN Headlines (ABS-CBN 2)
Arangkada Xtra Balita (RPN 9)
Frontpage: Ulat ni Mel Tiangco (GMA 7)
Saksi (GMA 7)
Teledyaryo (NBN 4)
TV Patrol (ABS-CBN 2)

Best Male Newscaster
Martin Andanar (Teledyaryo / NBN 4)
Julius Babao (TV Patrol / ABS-CBN 2)
Cito Beltran (ABS-CBN Headlines / ABS-CBN 2)
Mike Enriquez (Saksi / GMA 7)
Henry Omaga-Diaz (TV Patrol / ABS-CBN 2)
Erwin Tulfo (Magandang Umaga, Bayan / ABS-CBN 2)

Best Female Newscaster
Karen Davila (ABS-CBN Headlines / ABS-CBN 2)
Angelique Lazo (Arangkada Xtra Balita / RPN 9)
Vicky Morales (Saksi / GMA 7)
Korina Sanchez (TV Patrol / ABS-CBN 2)
Bernadette Sembrano (Flash Report Special Edition / GMA 7)
Mel Tiangco (Frontpage: Ulat ni Mel Tiangco / GMA 7)

Best Morning Show
Magandang Morning Philippines (RPN 9)
Magandang Umaga, Bayan (ABS-CBN 2)
Unang Hirit (GMA 7)

Best Morning Show Host
Bobby Andrews and Kaye Jimenez (Magandang Morning Philippines / RPN 9)
Julius Babao, Aljo Bendijo, Tin Tin Bersola, Cheryl Cosim, Ogie Diaz, Pia Guanio, Mon Ilagan, Edu Manzano, Cherie Mercado, Atty. Jesse Andres, Alex Santos, Connie Sison, Claudine Trillo, Erwin Tulfo, Bobby Yan and Company (Magandang Umaga, Bayan / ABS-CBN 2)
Love Añover, Lyn Ching-Pascual, Arnold Clavio, Suzie Entrata-Abrera, TJ Manotoc, Daniel Razon, Eagle Riggs, Lhar Santiago, Rhea Santos and Company (Unang Hirit, GMA 7)

Best Public Affairs Program
Crossroads (ZOE TV 11)
Debate with Mare and Pare (GMA 7)
Diyos at Bayan (ZOE TV 11)
Isyu (ABS-CBN 2)
Off the Record (ABS-CBN 2)

Best Public Affairs Program Host
Cito Beltran and Korina Sanchez (Isyu / ABS-CBN 2)
Randy David and Katrina Legarda (Off The Record / ABS-CBN 2)
Winnie Monsod and Oscar Orbos (Debate / GMA 7)
Carlos Padilla (Crossroads / ZOE TV 11)
Eddie Villanueva (Diyos at Bayan / ZOE TV 11)

Best Showbiz Oriented Talk Show
The Buzz (ABS-CBN 2)
S-Files (GMA 7)
S2: Showbiz Sabado (ABS-CBN 2)
Startalk (GMA 7)

Best Male Showbiz Oriented Talk Show Host
Boy Abunda (The Buzz / ABS-CBN 2)
Paolo Bediones (S-Files / GMA 7)
Richard Gomez (S-Files, GMA 7)
Edu Manzano (S2: Showbiz Sabado / ABS-CBN 2)
Joey Marquez (S-Files, GMA 7)

Best Female Showbiz Oriented Talk Show Host
Kris Aquino (The Buzz / ABS-CBN 2)
Janice de Belen (S-Files / GMA 7)
Cristy Fermin (Showbiz Sabado / ABS-CBN 2)
Rosanna Roces (Startalk / GMA 7)

Best Children Show
Art is-Kool (GMA 7)
Chikiting Patrol (GMA 7)
Epol/Apple (ABS-CBN 2)
Math-Tinik (ABS-CBN 2)
Sine'skwela (ABS-CBN 2)

Best Children Show Host
Robert Alejandro (Art is-Kool / GMA 7)
Chikiting Patrol Kids (Chikiting Patrol / GMA 7)
Marick Dacanay, Nina de Sagun, Toots Javellana and Bodjie Pascua (Epol/Apol / ABS-CBN 2)
Janus del Prado, Kristoffer Eursores and Hue Remulla (Math-Tinik / ABS-CBN 2)
Sine'skwela Hosts (Sine'skwela / ABS-CBN 2)

Best Travel Show
Biyaheng Langit (IBC 13)
Che Che Lazaro Presents (GMA 7)
Road Trip (RPN 9)
Travel and Trade (IBC 13)

Best Travel Show Host
Rey Langit and Reyster Langit (Biyaheng Langit / IBC 13)
Che Che Lazaro (Che Che Lazaro Presents / GMA 7)
Chiqui Roa-Puno (Travel and Trade / IBC 13)
Eric Quizon and Jeffrey Quizon (Road Trip / RPN 9)

Best Lifestyle Show
A Taste of Life (IBC 13)
All About You (GMA 7)
Better Home Ideas (RPN 9)
F (ABS-CBN 2)
Feel at Home with Charlene (ABS-CBN 2)

Best Lifestyle Show Host
Angel Aquino, Cher Calvin and Daphne Oseña-Paez (F / ABS-CBN 2)
Charlene Gonzales (Feel at Home with Charlene / ABS-CBN 2)
Heny Sison (A Taste of Life / IBC 13)
Regine Tolentino (Better Home Ideas / RPN 9)
Lucy Torres (All About You / GMA 7)

Special awards

Ading Fernando Lifetime Achievement Awardee
Luz Valdez

Gems of the Night
Bong Revilla (Male)
Charlene Gonzales (Female)

Teens of the Night
Richard Gutierrez (Male)
Iza Calzado (Female)

Stars of the Night
Edu Manzano (Male)
Alma Moreno (Female)

See also
PMPC Star Awards for TV

References

PMPC Star Awards for Television